Alan Steen (1922 – 26 August 2012) was an English professional footballer who played as a winger, active between 1939 and 1952.

Career
Steen made his debut for Wolverhampton Wanderers in the Football League as a 16 year old in March 1939, scoring a goal as Wolves beat Manchester United 3–0. Following the outbreak of World War II, Steen made 19 appearances for Wolves in the Midland Regional League, before joining the RAF; he was shot down in October 1943 and spent the rest of the War at the Stalag IV-B Prisoner of War camp. Upon the resumption of the League in 1946, Steen played for Luton Town, Aldershot, Rochdale and Carlisle United.

References

1922 births
2012 deaths
English footballers
Wolverhampton Wanderers F.C. players
Luton Town F.C. players
Aldershot F.C. players
Rochdale A.F.C. players
Carlisle United F.C. players
English Football League players
Association football midfielders